Achampet is a town and municipality in Nagarkurnool district of the Indian state of Telangana. The town is a revenue division headquarters. Achampet is located in the foothills of the Nallamala Forest.

History
Achampet was under the rule of the Zamindars for many years. These nobles also ruled nearby villages including Devadarikunta, Lingotam, Telkapally and Chepur. After the people won their independence from the Nizam.

Inscriptions suggest that a female ruler named Achamamba hailed from the Kolhpur Village. According to legend, she came to a deep forest and fought the General of Aurangzeb (now Delhi Sultan) and Malik Kafur in a tribal war. To honor her, the village was named Achampeta. The name was later changed to Chama Gadda and then Achampet.

Achampet is located near Srisailam.

Achampet was named a Revenue Division of Nagarkurnool district

Temples 
Umamaheshwaram

Notable people 

Vennu Mallesh (born 1984) – Singer on the internet.
Vijay Devarakonda (9 May 1989) – Actor in Tollywood
Guvvala Balaraju – MLA of Achampet

References

External links
Official Site 

Census towns in Nagarkurnool district
Mandals in Nagarkurnool district
Nagarkurnool district